Monster is the thirteenth mixtape by American rapper Future. It was released on October 28, 2014 by Freebandz Entertainment. Along with Beast Mode and 56 Nights, it is considered one of "a trilogy of album-quality mixtapes" that Future released following Honest. The mixtape was executive produced by producer Metro Boomin.

On October 28, 2019, Monster was released onto streaming platforms in celebration of five years since release, excluding the tracks "Intro", "Abu's Boomin" and "Fuck Up Some Commas"; the latter of which is available on streaming services through Future's 2015 album DS2.

Critical reception 
In Vice, Robert Christgau gave Monster a "B+" and described it as "strong like pop so seldom is. Vulnerable like pop so seldom is too." Sam C. Mac from Slant Magazine gave Monster three-and-a-half out of five stars, while PopMatters critic Colin McGuire gave it six out of ten stars. Future explores a darker sound on this mixtape due to the help of producer Metro Boomin. According to XXL, Future shines on this mixtape even without the help of other rappers since the record only includes one guest verse from Lil Wayne.

Track listing
Credits adapted from Tidal.

Personnel
Credits adapted from Tidal.

 Seth Firkins – mixing 
 Glenn Schick – mastering

Charts

References

2014 mixtape albums
Future (rapper) albums
Albums produced by Southside (record producer)
Albums produced by Metro Boomin
Albums produced by Nard & B
Albums produced by TM88